Ronald Eyre (13 April 1929 – 8 April 1992) was an English theatre director, actor and writer.

Biography
Eyre was born at Mapplewell, near Barnsley, Yorkshire and he taught at Queen Elizabeth's Grammar School, Blackburn and Giggleswick School. He became a leading director for the cinema, opera, television and the theatre. He was nominated for Broadway's 1975 Tony Award as Best Director (Dramatic) for London Assurance. He presented the BBC television documentary series The Long Search (1977), a survey of various world religions, which won a Red Ribbon at the American Film Festival.

Eyre was the godfather of British actress Emma Thompson.

Television
 As You Like It (1963) (TV) ... Director
 The Wednesday Play - A Crack in the Ice (1964) TV Episode ... Director and Dramatist
 Z Cars - "Window Dressing" (1965) TV Episode ... Director and Writer
 Tom Grattan's War (1968) TV Episode ... Director
 Jackanory - "Christmas Stories: The Selfish Giant" (1968) TV Episode ... Storyteller
 Jackanory - "Johhny the Clockmaker" (1971) TV Episode ... Storyteller
 Jackanory - "Johnny's Bad Day/Diana and Her Rhinoceros" (1971) TV Episode ...Storyteller
 Jackanory - "Paul the Hero of the Fire" (1971) TV Episode ... Storyteller 
 Jackanory - "Tim and Charlotte" (1971) TV Episode ... Storyteller
 Jackanory - eleven other TV Episodes
 Play of the Month - "Rasputin" (1971) TV Episode ... Writer
 The Long Search - (1977) (TV) Documentary Series... Writer and Host
 Falstaff (1982) (TV) ... Opera Director
 Wogan (1987) ... Interviewed
 Russell Harty 1934-1988 (1988) ... Interviewed
 Frontiers - Long Division (1990) ... Interviewed
 In My Defence - Neither Prison Nor Chains (1991) ... Interviewed

References

External links
 

1929 births
1992 deaths
British opera directors
English television directors
English theatre directors
People educated at Bromsgrove School
People from Mapplewell
Actors from Barnsley
20th-century English male actors
Male actors from Yorkshire
LGBT theatre directors
English LGBT writers
English male television actors
English television writers
English television producers
LGBT television producers
English gay actors
British gay writers
British male television writers
20th-century English screenwriters
20th-century English LGBT people